Michael Plaikner was an Italian luger who competed in the mid-1970s. A natural track luger, he won a silver medal with Johann Mair in the men's doubles event at the 1977 FIL European Luge Natural Track Championships in Seis am Schlern, Italy.

References
 Natural track European Championships results 1970-2010.

Living people
Italian male lugers
Italian lugers
Year of birth missing (living people)
Sportspeople from Südtirol